Dave Rollin Smith (October 13, 1940 – February 15, 2019) was the founder and chief archivist of Walt Disney Archives at Walt Disney Studios in Burbank, California.

Early life 
Smith was born on October 13, 1940 and raised in Pasadena, California. He appreciated Disney movies as a child and, having lived in California, visited Disneyland frequently. He graduated from UC Berkeley and spent a year and a half as an intern at the Library of Congress in Washington, D.C. He then moved back to California and worked as a librarian at UCLA for five years.

In the late 1960s, Smith was working on a bibliography on Walt Disney when he first heard of a possible archive being created by The Walt Disney Company. Smith, still working at UCLA at the time, wrote to the Disney Company with an offer of his services, which was accepted.

Career 

He joined the company on June 22, 1970, as its first archivist. His first task was to document all the items in Walt Disney's office that had been stored there since his death four years earlier.

Smith wrote many books, including Disney A to Z, an official encyclopedia of Disney knowledge, as well as the Walt Disney Trivia Books, and also co-authored Disney: The First 100 Years. In 2007, Smith received the Disney Legends Award, an honor given to people who have made significant contributions to The Walt Disney Company.

Between 1980 and 2001, Smith was the executive director of the Manuscript Society. He was also a member of the Society of California Archivists. On June 24, 2010, forty years after he began work at Disney, Smith announced he would soon be retiring. After retirement, he worked for Disney as a consultant. According to the Disney fans and historians, he was regarded as the final authority on the topic of Disney history.

Books 
 Disney: The First 100 Years (English , German )
 Disney A to Z
 Walt Disney Famous Quotes (ASIN B000PQ5CNO)
 Ultimate Disney Trivia Book Volume 2
 Ultimate Disney Trivia Book Volume 3
 Ultimate Disney Trivia Book Volume 4
 Disney Trivia from the Vault: Secrets Revealed and Questions Answered

References

External links 
 
 An interview with Dave Smith at themeparkinsider.com
 D23 entry

1940 births
2019 deaths
Writers from Pasadena, California
American archivists
Disney people
University of California, Berkeley alumni
Historians of animation